Peter Lorre (born László Löwenstein, ; June 26, 1904 – March 23, 1964) was a Hungarian and American actor, first in Europe and later in the United States. He began his stage career in Vienna, in the Austro-Hungarian Empire, before moving to Germany where he worked first on the stage, then in film in Berlin in the late 1920s and early 1930s. Lorre caused an international sensation in the Weimar Republic-era film M (1931), directed by Fritz Lang, in which he portrayed a serial killer who preys on little girls.

Of Jewish descent, Lorre left Germany after Adolf Hitler and the Nazi Party came to power. His second English-language film, following the multiple-language version of M (1931), was Alfred Hitchcock's The Man Who Knew Too Much (1934), made in the United Kingdom. Eventually settling in Hollywood, he later became a featured player in many Hollywood crime and mystery films. In his initial American films, Mad Love and Crime and Punishment (both 1935), he continued to play murderers, but he was then cast playing Mr. Moto, the Japanese detective, in a B-picture series.

From 1941 to 1946, he mainly worked for Warner Bros. His first film at Warner was The Maltese Falcon (1941), the first of many films in which he appeared alongside actors Humphrey Bogart and Sydney Greenstreet. This was followed by Casablanca (1942), the second of the nine films in which Lorre and Greenstreet appeared together. Lorre's other films include Frank Capra's Arsenic and Old Lace (1944) and Disney's 20,000 Leagues Under the Sea (1954). Frequently typecast as a sinister foreigner, his later career was erratic. Lorre was the first actor to play a James Bond villain as Le Chiffre in a TV version of Casino Royale (1954). Some of his last roles were in horror films directed by Roger Corman.

In 2017, The Daily Telegraph named him one of the best actors never to have received an Academy Award nomination.

Early life 
Lorre was born László Löwenstein on June 26, 1904, the first child of Alajos Löwenstein and his wife Elvira Freischberger, in the Hungarian town of Rózsahegy in Liptó County (German: Rosenberg; Slovak: Ružomberok, now in Slovakia). His parents, who were German-speaking Jews, had only recently moved there following his father's appointment as chief bookkeeper at a local textile mill. Alajos also served as a lieutenant in the Austrian Army Reserve, which meant that he was often away on military maneuvers.

László's mother died when he was four years old, leaving Alajos with three very young sons, the youngest several months old. He soon married his wife's best friend Melanie Klein, with whom he had two more children. However, Lorre and his stepmother never got along, and this colored his childhood memories. At the outbreak of the Second Balkan War in 1913, anticipating that this would lead to a larger conflict and that he would be called up, Alajos moved the family to Vienna. He served on the Eastern Front during the winter of 1914–15, before being put in charge of a prison camp due to heart trouble.

Acting career

In Europe (1922–1934) 

Lorre began acting on stage in Vienna aged 17, where he worked with Viennese Art Nouveau artist and puppeteer Richard Teschner. He then moved to Breslau and later to Zürich. In the late 1920s, the actor moved to Berlin, where he worked with Bertolt Brecht, including a role in Brecht's Man Equals Man and as Dr. Nakamura in the musical Happy End.

The actor became much better known after director Fritz Lang cast him as child-killer Hans Beckert in M (1931), a film reputedly inspired by the Peter Kürten case. Lang said that he had Lorre in mind while working on the script and did not give him a screen test because he was already convinced that Lorre was perfect for the part. The director said that the actor gave his best performance in M and that it was among the most distinguished in film history. Sharon Packer observed that Lorre played the "loner, [and] schizotypal murderer" with "raspy voice, bulging eyes, and emotive acting (a holdover from the silent screen) [which] always make him memorable." In 1932, Lorre appeared alongside Hans Albers in the science fiction film F.P.1 antwortet nicht about an artificial island in the mid-Atlantic.

When the Nazis came to power in Germany in 1933, Lorre took refuge first in Paris and then London, where he was noticed by Ivor Montagu, associate producer for The Man Who Knew Too Much (1934), who reminded the film's director, Alfred Hitchcock, about Lorre's performance in M. They first considered him to play the assassin in the film, but wanted to use him in a larger role despite his limited command of English at the time, which Lorre overcame by learning much of his part phonetically.

Michael Newton wrote in an article for The Guardian in September 2014 of his scenes with Leslie Banks in the film: "Lorre cannot help but steal each scene; he's a physically present actor, often, you feel, surrounded as he is by the pallid English, the only one in the room with a body." After his first two American films, Lorre returned to England to feature in Hitchcock's Secret Agent (1936). Lorre and his first wife, actress Celia Lovsky, boarded a Cunard liner in Southampton on July 18, 1934, to sail for New York a day after shooting had been completed on The Man Who Knew Too Much, having gained visitor's visas to the United States.

First years in Hollywood (1935–1940) 
Lorre settled in Hollywood and was soon under contract to Columbia Pictures, which had difficulty finding parts suitable for him. After some months employed effectively for research, Lorre decided that the 1866 Russian novel Crime and Punishment by Dostoevsky, would be a suitable project with himself in the central role. Columbia's head Harry Cohn agreed to make the film adaptation on the condition that he could lend Lorre to Metro-Goldwyn-Mayer, possibly as a means of recouping the cost of Lorre not appearing in any of his films.

For MGM's Mad Love (1935), set in Paris and directed by Karl Freund, Lorre's head was shaved for the role of Dr. Gogol, a demented surgeon. In the film, Gogol replaces the wrecked hands of a concert pianist with those of an executed knife throwing murderer. An actress who works at the nearby Grand Guignol theater, who happens to be the pianist's wife, is the subject of Gogol's unwelcome infatuation. "Lorre triumphs superbly in a characterization that is sheer horror", The Hollywood Reporter commented. "There is perhaps no one who can be so repulsive and so utterly wicked. No one who can smile so disarmingly and still sneer. His face is his fortune".

Lorre followed Mad Love with the lead role in Crime and Punishment (also 1935) directed by Josef von Sternberg. "Although Peter Lorre is occasionally able to give the film a frightening pathological significance," wrote Andre Sennwald in The New York Times on the film's release, "this is scarcely Dostoievsky's drama of a tortured brain drifting into madness with a terrible secret." Columbia offered him a five-year contract at $1,000 a week, but he declined.

Returning from England after appearing in a second Hitchcock picture (Secret Agent, 1936), he was offered and accepted a 3-year contract with 20th Century Fox. Starring in a series of Mr. Moto movies, Lorre played John P. Marquand's character, a Japanese detective and spy. Initially positive about the films, he soon grew frustrated with them. "The role is childish," he said, and eventually tended to angrily dismiss the films entirely. He twisted his shoulder during a stunt in Mr. Moto Takes a Vacation (1939), the penultimate entry of the series. In 1939, he attended a lunch at the request of some visiting Japanese officials; Lorre wore a badge that read "Boycott Japanese goods."

Late in 1938, Universal Pictures wanted to borrow Lorre from Fox for the top-billed titular role ultimately performed by Basil Rathbone in Son of Frankenstein (1939) starring Boris Karloff as Frankenstein's monster and Bela Lugosi as Ygor. Lorre declined the role because he thought his menacing parts were now behind him, although he was ill at this time. He had tested successfully in 1937 for the role of Quasimodo in an aborted MGM version of The Hunchback of Notre Dame, according to a Fox publicist one of two roles Lorre most wanted to play (the other was Napoleon). By now, frustrated by broken promises from Fox, Lorre had managed to end his contract.

After a brief period as a freelance, he signed for two pictures at RKO in May 1940. In the first of these, Lorre appeared as the anonymous lead in the B-picture Stranger on the Third Floor (1940), reputedly the first film noir. The second RKO film, also in 1940, was You'll Find Out, a musical comedy mystery vehicle for bandleader Kay Kyser in which Lorre spoofed his sinister image alongside horror stars Bela Lugosi and Boris Karloff.

Mainly at Warner Bros. (1941–1946) 

In 1941, Lorre became a naturalized citizen of the United States. Director John Huston effectively ended a period of decline for the actor and saved him from more B-pictures by casting him in The Maltese Falcon. Although Warner Bros. were lukewarm about Lorre at first, Huston was keen for him to play Joel Cairo. Huston observed that Lorre "had that clear combination of braininess and real innocence, and sophistication... He's always doing two things at the same time, thinking one thing and saying something else." Lorre himself reminisced fondly in 1962 about the "stock company" he now found himself working with: Humphrey Bogart, Sydney Greenstreet and Claude Rains. In his view, the four of them had the rare ability to "switch an audience from laughter to seriousness." Lorre was contracted to Warner on a picture-by-picture basis until 1943 when he signed a five-year contract, renewable each year, which lasted until 1946.

The year after Maltese Falcon, he portrayed the character Ugarte in Casablanca (1942). While Ugarte is a small part, it is he who provides Rick with the "Letters of Transit", a key plot device. Lorre made nine movies with Sydney Greenstreet counting The Maltese Falcon and Casablanca, a team which came to be called "Little Pete-Big Syd", although they did not always have much screen time in joint scenes. Most of these motion pictures were variations on Casablanca, including Background to Danger (1943, with George Raft); Passage to Marseille (1944), reuniting them with Humphrey Bogart and Claude Rains; The Mask of Dimitrios (1944); The Conspirators (1944, with Hedy Lamarr and Paul Henreid); Hollywood Canteen (1944); Three Strangers (1946), a suspense film about three people who are joint partners on a winning lottery ticket, with third-billed Lorre cast against type by director Jean Negulesco as the romantic lead, also starring Geraldine Fitzgerald; and Greenstreet and Lorre's final film together, suspense thriller The Verdict (1946), director Don Siegel's first feature, with Greenstreet and Lorre finally billed first and second, respectively.

Lorre returned to comedy with the role of Dr. Einstein in Frank Capra's version of Arsenic and Old Lace (released in 1944) starring Cary Grant and Raymond Massey. Writing in 1944, film critic Manny Farber described what he called Lorre's "double-take job", a characteristic dramatic flourish "where the actor's face changes rapidly from laughter, love or a security that he doesn't really feel to a face more sincerely menacing, fearful or deadpan."

Lorre's last film for Warner was The Beast with Five Fingers (1946), a horror film in which he played a crazed astrologer who falls in love with a character played by Andrea King. Daniel Bubbeo, in The Women of Warner Brothers, thought Lorre's "wildly over-the top performance" had "elevated the movie from minor horror to first-rate camp."

Lorre said his continuing friendship with Bertolt Brecht, in exile in California since 1941, had led studio head Jack L. Warner to 'graylist' him, and his contract with Warner Bros. was terminated on May 13, 1946. Warner would be a "friendly" witness at his appearance before the House Un-American Activities Committee in May 1947. Lorre himself was sympathetic to the short-lived Committee for the First Amendment, set up by John Huston and others, and added his name to advertisements in the trade press in support of the committee.

After World War II (1947–1964) 

After World War II and the end of his Warner contract, Lorre's acting career in Hollywood experienced a downturn, whereupon he concentrated on radio and stage work. In 1949 he filed for bankruptcy. In the autumn of 1950, he traveled to West Germany to make the film noir Der Verlorene (The Lost One, 1951) which Lorre co-wrote, directed and starred in. According to Gerd Gemünden in Continental Strangers: German Exile Cinema, 1933–1951, with the exception of Josef von Báky's Der Ruf (The Last Illusion, 1949), it is the only film by an emigrant from Germany which uses a return to the country "addressing questions of guilt and responsibility; of accountability and justice." While it gained some critical approval, audiences avoided it and it did badly at the box office.

In February 1952, Lorre returned to the United States, where he resumed appearances as a character actor in television and feature films, often parodying his "creepy" image. He was the first actor to play a James Bond villain when he portrayed Le Chiffre in a 1954 television adaptation of Ian Fleming's novel Casino Royale, opposite Barry Nelson as an American James Bond referred to as "Jimmy Bond". Lorre starred alongside Kirk Douglas and James Mason in 20,000 Leagues under the Sea (1954) around this time. Lorre appeared in NBC's espionage drama Five Fingers (1959), starring David Hedison, in the episode "Thin Ice", and, in 1960, in Rawhide as Victor Laurier in "The Incident of the Slavemaster" and in Wagon Train as Alexander Portlass in "The Alexander Portlass Story". Lorre appeared in six episodes of Playhouse 90 as well as two episodes of Alfred Hitchcock Presents broadcast in 1957 and 1960, the latter a version of the Roald Dahl short story "Man from the South" starring Steve McQueen, Lorre and McQueen's wife Neile Adams. He had a supporting role in the film Voyage to the Bottom of the Sea (1961).

In Lorre's last years, he worked with Roger Corman on several low-budget films, including two of the director's Edgar Allan Poe cycle: Tales of Terror (1962) with Vincent Price and Basil Rathbone; and The Raven (1963), again with Price, as well as Boris Karloff and Jack Nicholson. He again worked with Price, Karloff and Rathbone in the Jacques Tourneur-directed The Comedy of Terrors (1963).

Marriages and family 
Lorre was married three times: Celia Lovsky (1934 – March 13, 1945, divorced); Kaaren Verne (May 25, 1945 – 1950, divorced) and Anne Marie Brenning (July 21, 1953 – March 23, 1964, his death). In 1953, Brenning bore Lorre's only child, Catharine. Anne Marie Brenning died in 1971. His daughter later made headlines after serial killer Kenneth Bianchi confessed to police investigators that he and his cousin and fellow "Hillside Strangler" Angelo Buono, posing as undercover police officers, had stopped her in 1977 with the intent of abduction and murder, but let her go on learning that she was the daughter of Peter Lorre. It was only after Bianchi was arrested that Catharine realized whom she had met. Catharine died of complications from diabetes, on May 7, 1985, aged 32.

Failing health and death 

Lorre had suffered from chronic gallbladder troubles, for which doctors had prescribed morphine. Lorre became trapped between the constant pain and addiction to morphine to ease the problem. It was during the period of the Mr. Moto films that Lorre struggled with and overcame his addiction. Having quickly gained 100 lb (45 kg) and not fully recovering from his addiction to morphine, Lorre suffered personal and career disappointments in his later life.

He died in Los Angeles on March 23, 1964, from a stroke. His body was cremated and his ashes were interred at the Hollywood Forever Cemetery in Hollywood. Vincent Price read the eulogy at his funeral.

Legacy and honours 

Lorre was inducted into the Grand Order of Water Rats, the world's oldest theatrical fraternity, in 1942. Lorre was honored with a star on the Hollywood Walk of Fame at 6619 Hollywood Boulevard in February 1960.

Actor Eugene Weingand, who was unrelated to Lorre, attempted in 1963 to trade on his slight resemblance to the actor by changing his name to "Peter Lorie", but his petition was rejected by the courts. After Lorre's death, however, he referred to himself as "Peter Lorre Jr.", claiming to be Lorre's son. He obtained a few small acting roles as a result, including a brief uncredited appearance as a cab driver in Alfred Hitchcock's Torn Curtain (1966) starring Paul Newman and Julie Andrews.

Filk songwriter Tom Smith (1988) wrote a tribute to Lorre's acting called "I Want to Be Peter Lorre", which was nominated for the "Best Tribute" Pegasus Award in 1992 and 2004, and which won the award for "Best Classic Filk Song" in 2006.

Punk cabaret band The World/Inferno Friendship Society's 2007 album Addicted to Bad Ideas: Peter Lorre's Twentieth Century is a concept album written as a tribute to Lorre, focusing on the transition from Weimar Germany to the Third Reich, and Lorre's later career and death. The World/Inferno Friendship Society's lead singer Jack Terricloth describes Lorre as "a strangely charismatic, extremely creepy person, which I think most punk rockers can identify with ... It's the lure of the other. He's the underdog, the outsider."

Filmography

Notes

References

Bibliography

Further reading

External links 

 
 
 
 
 The Peter Lorre Companion
 Photographs of Peter Lorre
 Peter Lorre (in German) from the online-archive of the Österreichischen Mediathek

1904 births
1964 deaths
20th-century American male actors
20th-century Hungarian male actors
American male film actors
American male radio actors
American people of Hungarian-Jewish descent
Austro-Hungarian emigrants to the United States
Burials at Hollywood Forever Cemetery
German-language film directors
Hungarian Jews
Hungarian male film actors
Jewish American male actors
Jewish emigrants from Nazi Germany to the United States
Naturalized citizens of the United States
People from Ružomberok
Warner Bros. contract players
20th-century American Jews